Marek Bolesław Kotlinowski (born 13 May 1956 in Gorlice) is a Polish politician and lawyer, Vice-Marshal of the Sejm. He was elected to the Sejm on 25 September 2005, getting 9,421 votes in 13 Kraków district as a candidate from the League of Polish Families list. Since 6 November 2006 he is a judge of the Polish Constitutional Tribunal.

He was also a member of Sejm 2001-2005.

See also 
Members of Polish Sejm 2005-2007

External links 
Marek Kotlinowski - parliamentary page - includes declarations of interest, voting record, and transcripts of speeches.

1956 births
Constitutional court judges
Living people
People from Gorlice
League of Polish Families politicians
Deputy Marshals of the Sejm of the Third Polish Republic
Members of the Polish Sejm 2005–2007
Members of the Polish Sejm 2001–2005